Cristóbal de Mesa (Fregenal de la Sierra, 15 October 1556 – Madrid, 27 September 1633) was a Spanish Mannerist poet and writer. He studied at Salamanca. He befriended poets Fernando de Herrera and Torquato Tasso. In addition to writing epics, he also translated Virgil.

Works
Some of his poems and epics are:
 El patrón de España (1612)
 La restauración de España (1607)
 El valle de lágrimas y diversas rimas (1607)
 Las Navas de Tolosa (1594)

References 

Writers from Extremadura
Spanish male writers
1559 births
1633 deaths